The Basílica Menor del Santo Niño de Cebú (Minor Basilica of the Holy Child of Cebú), commonly known as Santo Niño Basilica, is a basilica in Cebu City in the Philippines that was founded in 1565 by Fray Andrés de Urdaneta and Fray Diego de Herrera. It is the oldest Roman Catholic church in the country, allegedly built on the spot where the image of the Santo Niño de Cebú was found during the expedition of Miguel López de Legazpi. 

This image of the Child Jesus is the same presented by Ferdinand Magellan to the chief consort of Rajah Humabon on the occasion of their royal Baptism to Roman Catholicism on April 14, 1521. The image was found by a soldier named Juan de Camuz forty years later, preserved in a wooden box, after Legazpi had razed a local village.  When Pope Paul VI made the church a basilica in 1965, he declared it to be "the symbol of the birth and growth of Christianity in the Philippines."

The present building was completed from 1739–1740, and was designated by the Holy See as the "Mother and Head of all Churches in the Philippines".

History

The church of the Holy Child was founded by Fray Andrés de Urdaneta, O.S.A. on April 28, 1565, the day when the image of the Holy Child was found in a partially burned hut. More than a week passed after the rediscovery of the image on May 8, 1565, Miguel Lopez de Legazpi initiated the founding of the first Spanish settlement in the Philippines. On the spot of the house where the image of the Santo Niño was found, the monastery of the Holy Name of Jesus was constructed.

The first church to be built on the site where the image of the Holy Child was found was burned down on November 1, 1566. It was said to be built by Fr. Diego de Herrera using wood and nipa. Fray Pedro Torres, O.S.A. started the construction of a new church in 1605. It was finished in 1626 but was again burned in March 1628. Fray Juan Medina, O.S.A. started the construction of another church that year, using stone and bricks, a great innovation at that time. Construction was stopped because the structure was found to be defective.

Present church
On February 29, 1735, Father Provincial Bergaño, Governor-General Fernando Valdes, Bishop Manuel Antonio Decio y Ocampo of Cebu and Fray Juan de Albarran, O.S.A. started the foundations of the present church, using stone. Since the friars did not have the means to complete the church, they enlisted the help of the parishioners of Opon and San Nicolas to contribute materials, while the people of Talisay contributed labor. The lack of chief craftsmen and officers forced Fray Albarran to acquire some knowledge of architecture. The church was finished around 1739.

On January 16, 1740, the miraculous image was enthroned in the new Augustinian church.

In 1789, the church underwent a renovation. In 1889, Fray Mateo Diez, O.S.A. did another renovation. The original features of the church have been retained except for the windows which he added. In 1965, both the church and convent underwent a bigger restoration on the occasion of the fourth centennial of the Christianization of the country. The facelifting was made with utmost respect for the historical character of the old structure.

In 1965, Ildebrando Cardinal Antoniutti, Papal Legate to the Philippines, conferred the church the honorific title Basílica Menor upon the authority of Pope Paul VI. As a Minor Basilica, it is given precedence over other churches and other privileges. Philippine President Ferdinand E. Marcos also declared it a National Landmark.

The Basilica del Santo Niño remains under the care of the Augustinian Friars.

2013 Bohol earthquake

On October 15, 2013, a 7.2-magnitude earthquake shook Tagbilaran, Bohol, its force felt throughout the Visayas. It caused more than 220 casualties, and damages to buildings, particularly historical landmarks and churches in Bohol.

In Cebu City, the earthquake destroyed most of the Basilica's belfry and façade; some walls and frescoes were cracked. A video of the collapse can be seen here.

Restoration 
The restoration of the basilica was one of the 16 projects facilitated by National Historical Commission of the Philippines in Cebu province in 2015. 

Prior to restoration, the rubbles from the collapsed belfry were subjected to laboratory tests to analyze their composition to ensure that the new building materials will be compatible to the old and existing structure. During restoration, mechanical and chemical cleaning of the exterior walls were performed. Moreover, lime water were injected into the rubble core to make it stronger. The bell tower was fully restored in October 2016.

Church complex

Pilgrim Center

The devotees kept increasing over the years and could easily fill the Basilica. To accommodate this growing number of devotees who come to hear mass in the Basilica, a pilgrim center was built within the church compound opposite of the Basilica and Holy Mass is celebrated on Fridays and other Religious Festivities are held here in the open-air, theater-like structure.

Completed in September 1990, this open-air structure can accommodate 3,500 people. The basement of the Pilgrim's Center houses the Basilica Del Sto. Niño Museum.

Museum
The museum was first established in 1965 by Fr. Ambrosio Galindez, O.S.A. for the purpose of the commemoration of the Fourth Centennial of the Christianization of the Philippines. It was then located at a certain room in the convent. Old church documents dating back to the 17th century, antique church furniture, antique church things (i.e. Chalice, Altar Table, Thurible, etc.), and antique vestments of the priests are in display. The old vestments of the Sto. Niño de Cebu dating back to the 17th century are also in display. The relics and statues of the different saints are also in exhibit. The replicas of the Sto. Niño used in different pilgrimages in the Philippines and abroad are displayed. Some donated jewelleries and gift toys to the Sto. Niño are in display also.

The Basilica del Sto. Niño Museum is currently located at the basement of the Pilgrim Center.

Basilica del Santo Niño Library
Originally for exclusive use by the friars, in 2000, the church library was opened to all serious nonclerical researchers.  Its collection covers religious subjects and non-religious disciplines including history, science, philosophy, Filipiniana, and periodicals.

Designation
The Church and Convent of Santo Niño was declared a National Historical Landmark in 1941. In 1965, Pope Paul VI declared the basilica to be "the symbol of the birth and growth of Christianity in the Philippines." In his pontificate, the ecclesiastical document Ut Clarificetur designated the basilica as the "Mother and Head of all Churches in the Philippines" (Mater et Caput... Omnium Ecclesiarum Insularum Philippinarum).

The National Museum of the Philippines collectively declared the Church and Convent of Santo Niño and the Magellan's Cross Pavilion as a National Cultural Treasure.

Location
The Basílica Menor del Santo Niño de Cebu Basilica Complex is located in city block bordered by Osmeña Boulevard, D. Jakosalem St, P. Burgos St. and the Plaza Sugbo where the Magellan's Cross is located.  The main entrance is on Osmeña Boulevard.  Two blocks north of the basilica is the Cebu Metropolitan Cathedral, the seat of the Roman Catholic Archdiocese of Cebu.

Gallery

References

External links

 Official Website of the Basílica Minore del Santo Niño de Cebu
 The Augustinians in the Philippines
 The image of the Santo Niño, which is kept in the parish convent, is considered the oldest religious relic in the Philippines

Santo Nino
Buildings and structures in Cebu City
Basilica del Santo Nino
Roman Catholic churches in Cebu
National Historical Landmarks of the Philippines
Spanish Colonial architecture in the Philippines
Baroque architecture in the Philippines
Tourist attractions in Cebu City
1565 establishments in the Philippines
National Cultural Treasures of the Philippines
Churches in the Roman Catholic Archdiocese of Cebu